Paul Macarius Hebert (1907–1977) was a jurist who is best known as the longest serving Dean of the Louisiana State University's law school (now Paul M. Hebert Law Center), serving in that role with brief interruptions from 1937 until his death in 1977. One such interruption occurred in 1947-1948 when he was appointed as a judge for the United States Military Tribunals in Nuremberg, and presided over the IG Farben Trial.

Hebert attended Catholic High School and later Louisiana State University, both located in Baton Rouge. While at LSU he was a member of the Zeta Zeta chapter of Delta Kappa Epsilon and was a member of the Friars Club.

External links
 Hebert Nuremberg Documents and Photos
 Dissenting Opinion of Judge Paul M. Hebert (image of original document, 12-28-1948, Nuremberg Military Tribunal 6 - I.G. Farben Case, DigitalCommons@LSU Law Center

1907 births
1977 deaths
Judges of the United States Nuremberg Military Tribunals
Leaders of Louisiana State University
Louisiana State University alumni
20th-century American judges
20th-century American academics